Biotechnology in India is a sunrise sector within the Indian economy. Agencies of the Government of India concerned with the biotechnology industry include the Department of Biotechnology and the proposed Biotechnology Regulatory Authority of India. As of 2022, the sector is valued at $80 billion. The Indian biotechnology sector is fast growing, and the sector is expected to be valued at $150 billion by 2025 and surpass $300 billion in value by 2030.

History 
The first Indian biotechnology company to be established was Biocon, which was founded by Kiran Mazumdar-Shaw in 1978. The Indian biotechnology industry formally began in 1986 with the establishment of the Department of Biotechnology (DBT) by the Ministry of Science and Technology.

Regulation

Department of Biotechnology 

The Department of Biotechnology is an Indian government department under the Ministry of Science and Technology, responsible for administering development and commercialization in the field of modern biology and biotechnology in India. The DBT was also one of the world's first government departments that was established to focus solely on the biotechnology sector.

Biotechnology Regulatory Authority of India 

The Biotechnology Regulatory Authority of India (BRAI) is a proposed regulatory body in India for uses of biotechnology products including genetically modified organisms (GMOs). The institute was first suggested under the Biotechnology Regulatory Authority of India (BRAI) draft bill prepared by the Department of Biotechnology in 2008. Since then, it has undergone several revisions.

Companies

Vaccine manufactures 
India is the world's largest vaccine maker as of 2020. Prominent Indian vaccine manufactures include the Serum Institute of India (SII). SII is the world's largest vaccine manufacturer. Another prominent vaccine manufacturer is Bharat Biotech. Hester Biosciences is company that manufactures animal and poultry vaccines.

Other established companies 
 Advanced Enzymes 
 Biocon.
 Laurus Bio. The company is a subsidiary of Laurus Labs, and was originally company named Richcore, before Laurus acquired it and renamed it.
 Sea6 Energy is a startup working for producing fuel from seaweed.

Biotechnology startups 
There have been an increasing number of startups being founded in the Indian biotechnology industry. In 2021, the total number of biotechnology startups stood at 5365, whereas in 2010, there were only 50 startups in the sector. As of 2021, more than half of the biotechnology startups are being founded in the medical sector, however, other large sectors where biotechnology startups are being founded include 18% in the biotechnology services sector and 14% of startups are in agricultural biotechnology.

Biotechnology parks 
The DBT has set up biotechnology parks in India, and as of 2022, there are 9 biotechnology parks across the country. The parks have been set up by the DBT to give infrastructure support that will assist in making biotechnology research into products and services. The biotechnology parks give scientists and small and medium sized enterprises facilities that can help them in developing and demonstrating technologies, and assit in their pilot plant studies studies as well.

References

External links
 Department of Biotechnology (Ministry of Science & Technology)
 Indian Biosafety Rules & Regulations
 eProMIS (Department of Biotechnology)